Umm al Quşayr or Umm Quşayr may refer to several places in Syria

Umm Quşayr, As-Suwayda Governorate, a ruin in As-Suwayda Governorate at  
Umm al Quşayr, As-Suwayda Governorate a ruin in As-Suwayda Governorate at  
 Umm al Quşayr, Al-Hasakah, a village in Al-Hasakah Governorate